"If" is a single by Japanese idol girl group French Kiss, a sub-unit of AKB48. It was released on January 19, 2011. It debuted in 2nd place on the weekly Oricon Singles Chart and, as of May 30, 2011 (issue date), had sold 97,113 copies. It also reached number one on the Billboard Japan Hot 100.

References 

2011 singles
2011 songs
Japanese-language songs
French Kiss (band) songs
Billboard Japan Hot 100 number-one singles